Olceclostera ibar is a moth in the Apatelodidae family. It is found in Argentina.

The wingspan is about 29 mm. The forewings are light drab, suffused with light greyish olive. The hindwings are light cinnamon drab.

References

Natural History Museum Lepidoptera generic names catalog

Moths described in 1927
Apatelodidae